All-Time Top 100 TV Themes is the ninth volume of the Television's Greatest Hits series of compilation albums by TVT Records. TVT Records released the two-disc collection in 2005. It included 100 themes featuring tracks from the first seven discs of the series and newer themes from television series since the last disc was released in 1996. Notably excluded was any Western themed television series. The album catalog was later acquired by The Bicycle Music Company. In September 2011,  Oglio Records which headquarters is located at Los Angeles announced they were re-leasing the  Television's Greatest Hits song catalog after entering into an arrangement The Bicycle Music Company. A series of 9 initial "6-packs" including some of the songs from the album have been announced for 2011.

Track listing

Disc 1

Disc: 2

References

External links
Television's Greatest Hits at Oglio Records

2005 compilation albums
TVT Records compilation albums
Television's Greatest Hits albums